Andrzej Marek Pruszkowski (born 23 March 1960 in Michów, Lublin Voivodeship) is a former president (mayor) of Lublin in 1998–2006. Member of Law and Justice.

References

1960 births
Living people
Law and Justice politicians
Mayors of places in Poland
John Paul II Catholic University of Lublin alumni
Adam Mickiewicz University in Poznań alumni
People from Lubartów County